Majigram is a village in Mongalkote CD block in Katwa subdivision of Purba Bardhaman district in West Bengal, India.

Geography
It is located 49 km north of the district headquarters Bardhaman. It is 141 km from the state capital, Kolkata. This place near the border of the Bardhaman District and Birbhum District.

The region has an average elevation of 30 metres (100 ft). The nearby river is Ajay River.

Demographics
As per the 2011 Census of India, Majigram had a total population of 4,622 of whom 2,360 (51%) were males and 2,262 (49%) were females. Population below 6 years was 534. The total number of literates in Majigram was 2,700 (66.05% of the population over 6 years).

Work profile
In Majigram village, out of total population, 1658 were engaged in work activities. 92.04% of workers described their work as main work (employment or earning more than six for months), while 7.96% were involved in marginal activity providing livelihood for less than six months. Of 1658 workers engaged in main work, 307 were cultivators (owner or co-owner) while 951 were agricultural labourers.

Facilities

Transport
 Roads: Majigram is well connected with roads. The village contacted with Katwa-Natunhat Road. 
 Railway: Bankapasi Railway Station (11 km) and Kaichar Railway Station (8 km) are the nearby railway stations to Majigram. However, Burdwan Railway Station is a major railway station which is 45 km from Majigram.
 Air: There is a permanent helipad in Majigram.

Hospital
Singot Rural Hospital (with 50 beds) at Singot is located nearby. There is also a rural health center in this village.

Banking
There is a UCO Bank Branch in Majigram. A UCO Bank ATM is also in Majigram. 
Reacently Burdwan Co-opprative Bank Lt. has opened a new branch with 24x7 ATM facility in this village.

Post office
 Majigram has a post office. Recently it was upgraded to "Sub-Post Office."

Education

Majigram Bisweswari High School (10+2 with science, arts and vocational streams) is an upper primary with a secondary and higher secondary school in Majigram village of Mongalkot. It was established in 1950. The school's management is the Department of Education. It is a Bengali medium, co-educational school.

Majigram Bisweswari High School runs in four government school buildings, and has a total of 44 classrooms. The lowest class in the school is 5 and the highest is 12. This school has 17 male teachers and 10 female teachers. There is a library facility available in this school, with about 4700 books.

This school has a big playground and cycle stand. There are enough toilets for girls and boys in the school. The school provides a residential facility. The school also provides a meal facility, and meals are prepared in the school. A good laboratory is there for science practicals. Freshwater facility also provided in the school.

Majigram Bisweswari High School also offers vocational courses including automobiles, electric, amin survey and computers.

Other schools include:
 Majigram Free Primary School
 Majigram Das Para Free Primary School

Temples

Majigram has a multi-cultural heritage. The  found here are reminiscent of Bengali Hindu architecture. The old temples bear signs of Hinduism, mostly belonging to the Sakta and Vaishnava followers. There are many temples in Majigram.

Major temples:
 Sakombori (শাকম্ভরী দেবী) Temple
 Dauleshawr (দেউলেশ্বর শিব মন্দির) Lord Shiva Temple
 Dauleshawr (দেউলেশ্বর) Kali Mandir
 Radhamadhav (রাধামাধব) Temple
 Roypara Durga Temple
 Roypara Gopal Jeu Temple
 Gajon Temple
 Boro Voirovnath (ভৈরভনাথ) Temple
 Sardarpara Kali Mandir
 Parambabu's Kali Mandir
 Jogordharti (জগদ্ধাত্রী) Temple 
 M.S.A. Kali Mandir 
 Kakinder Shiva Mandir

There are many other temples in the village as well. More than 50 Lord Shiva temples are situated in Majigram.

References

Villages in Purba Bardhaman district